Saheonbu (Hanja:) administered inspections during Goryeo and Joseon dynasty in Korea. The organ inspected Hanyang, the capital, and periphery. It has several nicknames. It was also responsible for licensing officials, impeachment and legal inquiries, which also extends to the control of King's relatives. The strongest duty is to directly criticize king's order.

Since the organ took charge of judicial responsibility for officials and the subjects, the ethos was strict.

History
The board of inspection actually began several centuries earlier. During Silla dynasty, the title was converted to Saganwon during the reign of Gongmin of Goryeo.

Taejo of Joseon established the organ right after the foundation of Joseon Dynasty in 1392. The standard organization was 1 head officer and 12 officials with about 40 other bureaucrats.

Responsibility
 Regular meeting of royal court
 Payment of national debts
 Tributes
Gwageo

The system began in China, where the organ played a wider role at the royal court. In this sense, the organ and its responsibility was in line with Saganwon where the subjects remonstrate the order of King.

The issue of royal court was to control over the power between the king and the subjects, keeping abreast of the order of the government, which later produced severe side effects in some cases. Its work is quite similar to the board of audits and inspection in current time.

See also
 Uigeumbu
 Seungjeongwon

References

Politics of Korea
Goryeo
Joseon dynasty